"In the Springtime of His Voodoo" is a 1996 song written by American singer-songwriter Tori Amos. It is a harpsichord-driven rock dirge and was included on her third album, Boys for Pele (1996).

"In the Springtime of His Voodoo" was released in September 1996 as the fifth single from the Boys for Pele album in the US, containing remixes by house music producers Steve Donato and Vinny Vero.

This song was removed from the 1997 re-issued version of Boys for Pele in the UK and Australasia, due to time constraints after adding the Armand's Star Trunk Funkin' Mix of "Professional Widow".  "In the Springtime of His Voodoo" was also remixed and released as a dance single, but was a much smaller club success. Interest in the album resurfaced when Amos sang vocals on "Blue Skies", another club and dance hit by dance music artist BT that reached No. 1 on the Hot Dance/Club Play chart exactly one year after the release of Boys for Pele.

Critical reception 
Larry Flick from Billboard wrote, "Who'da thunk that Amos would become the belle of clubland? She has accomplished this feat thanks to several crafty 12-inchers that have placed her amid state-of-the-floor grooves. No doubt, her hot streak will continue with this sprawling and spacious post-production, which sews her vamps into a quickly shifting arrangement that mines electro-trance and deep-house ground." He added, "Remixers Vinny Vero and Stephen Donato had a field day with this tune, dissecting the melody and rebuilding it with a seemingly bottomless bag of sound effects and percussion rolls. Perfectly designed to give peak-hour club journeys a trippy, otherworldly feel."

Personnel (of original recording on Boys for Pele) 
 Tori Amos: Bösendorfer piano, harpsichord, vocals
 Alan Friedman: organ, drum programming
 Manu Katché: drums
 Steve Caton: guitars
 George Porter Jr: bass
 Mino Cinelu: percussion 
 Nancy Shanks: additional vocals
 Michael Deegan and Bernard Quinn: bagpipes

Singles and compilations

CD single 

"In the Springtime of His Voodoo (LP Mix) – 5:32
"In the Springtime of His Voodoo (Hasbrouck Heights Single Mix) – 4:25
"In the Springtime of His Voodoo (Hasbrouck Heights Club Mix) – 10:04
"In the Springtime of His Voodoo (Quiet Mix) – 4:30
"In the Springtime of His Voodoo (Sugar Dub) – 8:52

12" single 

"In the Springtime of His Voodoo (Hasbrouck Heights Single Mix) – 4:25
"In the Springtime of His Voodoo (Hasbrouck Heights Club Mix) – 10:04
"In the Springtime of His Voodoo (Quiet Mix) – 4:30
"In the Springtime of His Voodoo (Sugar Dub) – 8:52

Compilations 

2016 – the "Boys for Pele" 2 CD Deluxe includes "In the Springtime of His Voodoo (Rookery Ending)".

References

External links
 In the Springtime of His Voodoo
 Misheard lyrics of In The Springtime Of His Voodoo at Am I Right

1996 singles
Tori Amos songs
UK Singles Chart number-one singles
Songs written by Tori Amos
1996 songs